2014–15 Oulun Kärpät season  is the 30th season for Oulun Kärpät in Finnish Liiga.

Standings 

Top six advanced straight to quarter-finals, while teams between 7th and 10th positions played wild card round for the final two spots. The Liiga is a closed series and thus there is no relegation.

Schedule and results 

Oulun Kärpät season